Garett Bolles (born May 27, 1992) is an American football offensive tackle for the Denver Broncos of the National Football League (NFL). He played college football at Utah, and was drafted by the Broncos in the first round of the 2017 NFL Draft.

Early life
Bolles was born in Walnut Creek, California on May 27, 1992. His family moved to Lehi, Utah.  After being kicked out of his father's home, Bolles was picked up by the Freeman family, and rebuilt his life by reactivating himself as a member of the Church of Jesus Christ of Latter-day Saints (LDS Church). He attended Westlake High School in Saratoga Springs, Utah. Bolles played on the offensive and defensive lines in high school while also competing in lacrosse. While at Westlake, Bolles was arrested and suspended for three games after he and four other players extensively vandalized rival Lehi High School's football field.

Instead of playing college football straight out of high school, Bolles embarked on an LDS Church mission in Colorado Springs, Colorado.

College career
Following his LDS mission, Bolles decided to attend Snow College, where he played for the Badgers for two years before transferring to the University of Utah in 2016. Bolles earned NJCAA first-team All-America honors following his sophomore season at Snow College, starting all 11 games played. He was named the 2015 Western State Football League Offensive Player of the Year in addition to picking up All-WSFL first-team honors. Bolles helped Snow College finish No. 2 in the NJCAA rankings after winning the WSFL championship and Salt City Bowl.

Bolles signed with Utah as the No. 1 overall junior college prospect in 2016. Bolles was named to the All-Pac-12 Conference First-team in his only season with the University of Utah after opening all 13 games played (891 total snaps) at left tackle. He contributed to the Utes averaging close to 30 points per game and helped Utah's rushing offense rank third in the Pac-12 with 214.0 rushing yards per game. Bolles played on an offensive line that allowed just 2.1 sacks per game. After the season, Bolles decided to forgo his senior year and enter the 2017 NFL Draft.

Professional career
Bolles received an invitation to the NFL Combine as one of the top five offensive tackle prospects in the draft. He performed well and was able to raise his draft stock by showing athleticism in positional drills and having his 40-yard dash come under five seconds. Bolles completed every drill except for the bench press. He also participated at Utah's Pro Day and performed only positional drills for scouts and representatives in attendance. The majority of NFL Draft experts and analysts projected Bolles to be selected in either the first or second round. He was ranked the second best offensive tackle by ESPN and NFLDraftScout.com, was ranked the fourth best offensive tackle by Sports Illustrated, and was ranked the third best offensive tackle by NFL analysts Mike Mayock and Bucky Brooks.

2017 season

Bolles was drafted by the Denver Broncos in the first round (20th overall) of the 2017 NFL Draft. On May 11, 2017, Bolles signed a four-year, $11.01 million contract with $8.59 million guaranteed and a signing bonus of $6.16 million. Bolles opened all 16 games at left tackle to represent just the fifth time in team history a rookie left tackle started every game since starting lineups were tracked beginning in 1968. Bolles earned all-rookie honors from the PFWA, and was the sixth rookie to open the season at left tackle for the Broncos in Week 1.

2018 season
Bolles started all 16 games at left tackle in 2018.

2019 season
Bolles started all 16 games at left tackle in 2019 and played in all of Denver's offensive snaps.  He was criticized publicly by general manager John Elway for repeatedly getting flagged for holding penalties, more than any other player in the NFL in his first three seasons in the league.

2020 season
On May 1, 2020, the Broncos declined the fifth-year option on Bolles' contract, making him a free agent in 2021. On November 28, 2020, after improving greatly throughout the season, Bolles signed a four-year, $68 million contract extension with the Broncos. On January 8, 2021, Bolles was named as the second-team All-Pro left tackle.

2022 season
In Week 5, Bolles suffered a broken leg and was placed on season-ending injured reserve on October 10, 2022.

References

External links
 
 Utah Utes bio

1992 births
Living people
People from Lehi, Utah
Players of American football from Utah
American football offensive tackles
Converts to Mormonism
Snow Badgers football players
Utah Utes football players
Denver Broncos players
Latter Day Saints from Utah